Lotus Impress was an add-on of Lotus 1-2-3 edited in the early 1990s by Lotus Software, at that time leader in the spreadsheet market. It added to 1-2-3 the current Microsoft Excel "Format cells..." functions.

Sources 
Quoted in http://www.atarimagazines.com/compute/issue127/28_Lotus_123_release_.php
Supported by Microsoft Excel http://support.microsoft.com/kb/q61941/

Spreadsheet software
Impress
Presentation software